Aliaksandr Kuzmichou is a paralympic athlete from Belarus competing mainly in category T/F12 sprint and triple jump events.

Aliaksandr competed in the 2004 Summer Paralympics winning a bronze in the T12 400m and a silver in the F12 triple jump as well as competing in the 200m.

References

Paralympic athletes of Belarus
Athletes (track and field) at the 2004 Summer Paralympics
Paralympic silver medalists for Belarus
Paralympic bronze medalists for Belarus
Living people
Medalists at the 2004 Summer Paralympics
Year of birth missing (living people)
Paralympic medalists in athletics (track and field)
Belarusian male sprinters
Belarusian male triple jumpers